The Baleshwari River is located in Bangladesh, forming part of the eastern border of Bagerhat District and the western border of Barguna District. It borders on the east the largest mangrove forest in the world, in the Ganges-Brahmaputra delta, the Bangladesh part of which is set aside as the Sundarbans Reserve Forest. The Baleshwar River flows south into the Haringhata River, which flows into the Bay of Bengal.

See also
Bihanga Island, island in the Baleshwari river.

References

Rivers of Bangladesh
Sundarbans
Rivers of Barisal Division